Amerindo Investment Advisors Inc. was an Investment services firm, best known for making large profits during the Dot-com boom of the 1990s and 2000s.

The origins of the company date to the early 1980s, when Alberto Vilar and  Gary A. Tanaka founded two companies named "Amerindo" in England and Panama.  The American branch, called "Amerindo Investment Advisors Inc." was founded in 1985.

The East Coast office was located in the 399 Park Avenue in New York City, the West Coast office, and "principal place of business" was located at One Embarcadero Center in San Francisco, and the international office was in London.

Vilar made an early and very successful investment in Yahoo!, which once totaled 40% of the fund's investment portfolio.  Vilar's financial strategy included investing in purchasing shares of companies shortly after their initial public offering.

The company's "flagship" financial product, the "Amerindo Technology Fund," was known for investing in startup high tech and Dot-com companies.  Following many years of strong growth during the internet boom the fund came to a crash.

Vilar gained a lot of press for declaring the internet to be "bigger than the Industrial Revolution."

Fraudulent activities
Amerindo had advertised that its "Guaranteed Fixed Rate Deposit Account" (GFRDA) would be invested in "high quality, short-term deposits" that would produce a "fixed-rate of interest for a fixed-term." Instead, these funds were invested in risky dot com ventures, and the fund lost large sums after the 2000 dot-com bust, which meant that Amerindo couldn't repay the investors, costing investors millions of dollars.

Separately, Amerindo investor Lily Cates, mother of actress Phoebe Cates, invested $5 million in the "Amerindo Small Business Investment Company" venture, but most of her investment was rerouted to pay for Amerindo's business expenses, donated to various charities to which Vilar had made pledges that he couldn't afford, and to pay a settlement from a former client who was suing Amerindo about the GFRDA account.  In September 2003, Vilar ordered an employee to copy Cates' signature onto a document that purported to authorize a $250,000 transfer, with most of that money going into Vilar's personal account.  In 2005, Cates filed a complaint with the U.S. Securities and Exchange Commission regarding Vilar and Amerindo.  During the investigation, Vilar lied to the SEC, claiming that Cates wasn't a client and that he did not own the Panamanian subsidiary.

In 2005, Vilar and Tanaka were convicted for organizing a series of transactions that defrauded their clients.  After the nine-week trial, Vilar was convicted of two counts of securities fraud; two counts of wire fraud; four counts of money laundering; investment adviser fraud; mail fraud; making false statements; and participating in a conspiracy to commit securities fraud, investment adviser fraud; wire fraud, mail fraud; and money laundering and Tanaka was convicted of three of the twelve counts with which he was charged: securities fraud; investment adviser fraud; and conspiring to commit securities fraud; investment adviser fraud; wire fraud; mail fraud; and money laundering.

References

Financial services companies established in 1985
2000s economic history
Investment management companies of the United States
Defunct financial services companies of the United States
Companies based in San Francisco
American companies established in 1985